The Milceni or Milzeni were a West Slavic tribe, who settled in the present-day Upper Lusatia region. They were first mentioned in the middle of the 9th century AD by the Bavarian Geographer, who wrote of 30 civitates which possibly had fortifications. They were gradually conquered by Germans during the 10th century. Modern descendants of the Milceni are the Sorbs of the Free State of Saxony, Germany.

History 

The Milceni travelled to Upper Lusatia in the 7th century during the Migration Period. The exact borders of their settlement area are disputed. It is generally accepted that their fielded land had fruitful loess soil and had dimensions of approximately 50 km from east to west and 20 km from north to south. The northern border was in swampy and partially infertile terrain, while the southern border formed part of the Lausitzer Bergland. The hills of Burkau near Kamenz formed a natural boundary for the Milceni in the west, while their territory bordered that of the Besunzane in the east. The boundaries of the tribe have also been given as the Pulsnitz River in the west and the Kwisa River in the east.

The Ortenburg castle of Bautzen is built around fortifications originally constructed by the Milceni. Charles the Younger, son of Charlemagne, defeated the Milceni and burnt their fortress in 806. Henry the Fowler, King of the Germans, defeated the Slavic tribe in 932 and demanded conversion to Christianity, although this was only partially successful. Emperor Otto I defeated the Lusatians in 963 and placed them under the rule of Margrave Gero. The Milceni were finally subjugated by Margrave Ekkehard I of Meissen ca. 990 and had their territory incorporated into the Holy Roman Empire. The Milceni were then gradually Germanized or merged with the Lusatians of Lower Lusatia into the Sorbian ethnic group.

During the 10th–12th centuries, the region of Bautzen was known in written sources (e.g. Thietmar of Merseburg) as Gau Milsca. Temporarily conquered by the Polish king Bolesław I the Brave, the Milceni lands returned under German rule by 1031. In Polish, Upper Lusatia was known as Milsko until the 15th century. The Milceni were still mentioned in the 12th century Song of Roland ("the second of big-headed men from Misnes– along the vertebrae all down their backs these men have tufted bristles, just like hogs"). Enfeoffed to Duke Vratislaus II of Bohemia in 1076, their estates later became known as Land Budissin and Upper Lusatia.

See also 
Sorbs
Lusatia
Margraviate of Meissen
List of Medieval Slavic tribes

References

External links 
Die Milzener e.V.

West Slavic tribes
History of Saxony
Sorbs
Upper Lusatia